Otakar Brousek (28 September 1924 in Krhanice – 14 March 2014) was a Czech actor and voice actor. He appeared primarily in stage productions. He also appeared in around forty films, including Andělská tvář (2002), Svatby pana Voka (1970), Můj brácha má prima bráchu (1975) and the television series F. L. Věk (1971).

Brousek died on 14 March 2014 in Prague, aged 89. He was survived by his children, actors Otakar Brousek Jr. and Jaroslava Brousková.

References

External links
 

1924 births
2014 deaths
Male actors from Prague
Czech male film actors
Czech male stage actors
Czech male television actors
Czech male voice actors
People from Benešov District
Czechoslovak male film actors
Czechoslovak male actors
Recipients of the Thalia Award